Kathryn Grant, née Ptacek (born September 12, 1952) is an American writer and editor. Since 1981, she has published science fiction, fantasy, horror, suspense, and romance short stories and novels under her maiden and married names, and under the pseudonyms Les Simons, Kathryn Atwood, Anne Mayfield, and Kathleen Maxwell. She is the editor and publisher of the writers-market magazine The Gila Queen's Guide to Markets.

Biography
Kathryn Anne Ptacek was born on September 12, 1952 in Omaha, Nebraska, United States, but she was raised in Albuquerque, New Mexico. She received her B. A. in Journalism, with a minor in history, with honors from the University of New Mexico, Albuquerque, in 1974. She was married to Charles L. Grant from February 1982 until his death in 2006.

She has also edited several anthologies of short stories. Her short story "Each Night, Each Year" was nominated for the 1989 Bram Stoker Award for Best Short Fiction.

Bibliography
This is a partial bibliography of her work.

As Les Simons

Single novels
 Gila! (1981)

As Kathryn Atwood

Single novels
 Satan's Angel (1981)
 Renegade Lady (1982)
 The Lawless Heart (1984)
 My Lady Rogue (1986)
 Aurora (1987)

As Anne Mayfield

Single novels
 The Wayward Widow (1982)

As Kathleen Maxwell

Single novels
 The Devil's Heart (1983)
 Winter Masquerade (1984)

As Kathryn Ptacek

Single novels
 Shadoweyes (1984)
 Blood Autumn (1985)
 Kachina (1986)
 In Silence Sealed (1988)
 Ghost Dance (1990)
 The Hunted (1993)

Omnibus collections
 Looking Backward in Darkness (2013)

As Kathryn Grant

Land of Ten Thousand Willows
 The Phoenix Bells (1987)
 The Black Jade Road (1989)
 The Willow Garden (1989)

Anthologies edited
 Women of Darkness (1989)
 Women of Darkness II

References and sources

External links

1952 births
20th-century American novelists
21st-century American novelists
American editors
American women editors
American fantasy writers
American horror writers
American people of Czech descent
American women short story writers
American women novelists
Writers from Albuquerque, New Mexico
University of New Mexico alumni
Living people
Women science fiction and fantasy writers
Women horror writers
20th-century American women writers
21st-century American women writers
20th-century American short story writers
21st-century American short story writers
Pseudonymous women writers
20th-century pseudonymous writers
21st-century pseudonymous writers